The Hospital Infantil Sabará (English: Sabará Infantile Hospital) is a children's hospital located in Higienópolis, Sao Paulo, Brazil.

References

External links
 Official website

Hospitals in São Paulo